Kaaterskill Falls is an 1826 oil on canvas painting by British-American painter Thomas Cole, founder of the Hudson River School. It depicts the Kaaterskill Falls in Upstate New York.

Artist's background

Tom Christopher wrote that “[Thomas] Cole’s greatest artistic asset proved to be his untutored eye.”  Cole emigrated to America with his family in the spring of 1819 at the age of eighteen.  As a child, his surroundings were of Lancashire, England, an area known to be an epicenter of Britain’s primarily industrial region.  Because of this, Cole was granted an additional clarity of and sensitivity to the vibrancy of American landscapes awash with color, a stark contrast to the bleak and subdued landscapes of the country he left behind.

History

The painting was commissioned by Daniel Wadsworth in 1826. He bequeathed it to the Wadsworth Atheneum in 1848; it remains in its possession.

References

Citations

Works cited
 Christopher, Tom. "Living Off the Landscape: How Thomas Cole and Frederick Church made Themselves at Home in the Hudson River Valley." Humanities 30, no. 4 (2009):6-11.
 Noble, Luis Legrand. The Life and Works of Thomas Cole. Edited by Elliot S. Vesell Cambridge, Massachusetts: The Belknap Press of Harvard University Press, 1964.
 Great Northern Catskills of Greene County. “Hudson River School of Art”. http://www.greatnortherncatskills.com/arts-culture/hudson-river-school-art.

External links
 Explore Thomas Cole provided by the National Park Service

1826 paintings
Paintings by Thomas Cole
Hudson River School paintings
Crosses in art